Tokmak may refer to one of the following:
Tokmak, Ukraine, a city in Zaporizhzhia Oblast, Ukraine
Tokmak, Uzbekistan, a city in Uzbekistan
Tokmok, a city in Kyrgyzstan, often also spelt Tokmak
Molochna, also referred to as Tokmak by Nogais.

See also 
Tokamak (disambiguation)